Myself Pendu is a 2015 Punjabi comedy movie directed by Surinder Rihal under the banner of Music Box Media Entertainment Co., releasing on 4 September 2015. Myself Pendu starring Preet Harpal, Sayali Bhagat and Ather Habib in lead roles.

Plot 
This is the story of two guys (Preet & Harpal) played by Preet Harpal & Ather Habib. They belong to a middle-class family & have a very care free attitude. They are never serious towards life & future. They keep on making schemes which can make them live a luxurious life. Their father who is Ex Sarpanch always try to teach them the facts of life so as to make them efficient & independent for at least those things which are necessary for daily life. On the other hand, their mother always supports them for whatever rubbish they do.
First time Jaswinder Singh Bhalla is performing in double role. The other one is a prized gangster Kaka Bishnoi. Both of them stage plan to loot a Jeweller so that they can get arrested their father who is look alike of gangster Kaka Bishnoi and claim prize of 2.5 crores from Government. They convince their mother who further convinces their father. They also take Police inspector into confidence and make a plan. Then they went to loot jeweller where as a coincidence real gangster also come along with his gang and as already planned police arrives. In ensuing melee real gangster is arrested and the gang members take away Ex Sarpanch considering him their boss.

Cast
Preet Harpal
Sayali Bhagat
Satwant Kaur
Jaswinder Bhalla
Upasana Singh
Ather Habib
Satinder Satti
Surinder Rihal 
Jaspinder Cheema... Guest Appearance
Navraj Hans... Guest Appearances
Madhurima Tulli... Guest Appearance

Music
Music composed by Nick Dhammu and Original score composed by Gurcharan Singh. Music released on

Junglee Music.

Reception

Box office

Myself Pendu was worldwide released on 5 September 2015.

Critical response
Jasmine Singh of The Tribune termed movie as flop. ABP Sanjha also gave negative review to the movie.

References

External links
 
Official Website
MySelf Pendu Facebook

2015 films
Punjabi-language Indian films